{{Infobox Boxingmatch
| fight date    = November 14, 2009
| Fight Name    = Firepower
| image         = 
| location      = MGM Grand Garden Arena, Paradise, Nevada, United States 
| fighter1      = Manny Pacquiao 
| nickname1     = Pac-Man
| record1       = 49–3–2 (37 KO)
| hometown1     = Saranggani Province, Philippines
| height1       = 5 feet 6+1/2 inches
| weight1       = 144 pounds
| recognition1  = IBO and The Ring light welterweight champion[[The Ring (magazine)|The Ring]] No. 1 ranked pound-for-pound fighter6-division world champion
|style1 = Southpaw
| fighter2      = Miguel Cotto
| nickname2     = Junito
| record2       = 34–1 (27 KO)
| hometown2     = Caguas, Puerto Rico
| height2       = 5 feet 8 inches
| weight2       = 145 pounds
| recognition2  = WBO welterweight championThe Ring No. 7 ranked pound-for-pound fighter2-division world champion
| style2 = Orthodox
| titles        = WBO welterweight title
| result        = Pacquiao wins via 12th-round TKO
}}

Manny Pacquiao vs. Miguel Cotto, billed as Firepower'', was a boxing match for the WBO welterweight championship. The bout was held on November 14, 2009, at the MGM Grand Garden Arena, in Las Vegas, Nevada, United States. Pacquiao won the fight via technical knockout in the twelfth round.

Negotiations

The fight was sanctioned as a world title fight in the welterweight division, where the weight limit is 147 pounds, however Cotto's camp agreed to fight at a catchweight of 145 pounds to accommodate Pacquiao's smaller physique. Cotto's camp also conceded the larger share of the purse to Pacquiao, who received a 65% share of pay-per-view buys, compared to Cotto's 35% share.

The fight

Rounds 1–8
In the opening round both fighters were tentative, although Cotto appeared to have the edge, as he connected with several solid jabs that arguably won him the round. However, from the second round onwards Pacquiao picked up the pace, as he knocked Cotto down in round three with a right hook, and then again in round four with a left uppercut. In round five Cotto mounted a brief comeback and arguably won the round, but thereafter Pacquiao went on to dominate the fight. Cotto had some success when he managed to pin Pacquiao against the ropes, although Pacquiao later admitted that he had allowed this to happen, as he wanted to test Cotto's power.

Rounds 9–12
After a one-sided ninth round in favor of Pacquiao, wherein Cotto received significant punishment, many people thought that Cotto's corner should have stopped the fight. At this point, Cotto's wife even left the arena. However, a bloodied up Cotto decided to continue the fight, but he could not evade Pacquiao's onslaught, prompting the referee to stop the fight fifty-five seconds into the twelfth round. Pacquiao was ahead on all three judges' scorecards before the stoppage, which read 109–99, 108–99, and 108–100, all in favor of Pacquiao.

Punch stats
Total punches: Pacquiao landed 336 out of 780 (43%), whereas Cotto landed 172 out of 597 (29%).
Total jabs: Pacquiao landed 60 out of 220 (27%), whereas Cotto landed 79 out of 297 (27%).
Total power punches: Pacquiao landed 276 out of 560 (49%), whereas Cotto landed 93 out of 300(31%).

Aftermath
With this victory, Pacquiao took the WBO World welterweight title (his seventh world championship), to become the first boxer in history to win seven world titles in seven different weight divisions. Pacquiao also won the special WBC Diamond Belt. After the fight, promoter Bob Arum stated: "Pacquiao is the greatest boxer I've ever seen, and I've seen them all, including Ali, Hagler and Sugar Ray Leonard." Meanwhile, Cotto was taken to a hospital as a precaution.

The fight generated 1.25 million buys and 70 million dollars in domestic pay-per-view revenue, making it the most watched boxing event of 2009. Pacquiao earned around 22 million dollars for his part in the fight, whilst Cotto earned around 12 million dollars. Pacquiao–Cotto also generated a live gate of $8,847,550 from an official crowd of 15,930.

Pacquiao's victory sparked a media frenzy, concerning his latest achievement against Cotto, and a potential match-up with Floyd Mayweather Jr.

Maincard

Televised
Middleweight bout:  Julio Cesar Chavez Jr. vs.  Troy Rowland
Chavez Jr. defeated Rowland via unanimous decision (97–93, 98–92, 99–91).
WBA Super Welterweight Championship bout:  Yuri Foreman vs.  Daniel Santos
Foreman defeated Santos via unanimous decision (117–109, 117–109, 116–110) to win the WBA World super welterweight title.
Welterweight bout:  Alfonso Gomez vs.  Jesus Soto Karass
Gomez defeated Soto Karass via technical decision (58–54, 57–55, 57–55) to win the vacant WBC Continental Americas welterweight title. The fight was stopped at 2:41 of round six, due to a cut on Gomez caused by an accidental headbutt.

Untelevised
Super Welterweight bout:  Rodrigo García vs.  Martin Vierra
 Garcia defeated Vierra via unanimous decision (40–36, 40–36, 40–36).
Bantamweight bout:  Eden Sonsona vs.  Eilon Kedem
Sonsona defeated Kedem via technical knockout in the second round.
Middleweight bout:  Matt Korobov vs.  James Winchester
Korobov defeated Winchester via unanimous decision (60–54, 60–54, 60–54).
Flyweight bout:  Richie Mepranum vs.  Ernie Marquez
Mepranum defeated Marquez via split decision (56–57, 57–56, 58–55).
Lightweight bout:  Abner Cotto vs.  Guadalupe Guzman
Cotto defeated Guzman via unanimous decision (60–54, 60–54, 59–55).

References

External links
 , uploaded by Top Rank

Cotto
2009 in boxing
Boxing in Las Vegas
2009 in sports in Nevada
November 2009 sports events in the United States
MGM Grand Garden Arena
Boxing on HBO